Bleeder is a 1999 Danish crime drama film written and directed by Nicolas Winding Refn. The film was successful in Denmark, but did not live up to the success of Refn's previous film Pusher.

Plot
The film follows the friends Leo and Lenny, who live in Nørrebro, a working-class neighborhood in Copenhagen. Leo lives in a rundown apartment with his girlfriend Louise. Lenny is a shy and quiet film expert who works with his and Leo's mutual friend Kitjo, in a video store that rents out art films as well as a huge collection of pornographic films.

As a subplot, we follow Lenny, who is trying to build a relationship to Lea, a girl that works in a local grill bar. Lenny asks Lea out to see a movie, but he chickens out when he sees her at the theatre. Lenny spends most of his time both at home and at work watching films.

When Leo finds out that Louise is pregnant and wants to keep the baby, he becomes more and more aggressive. After witnessing a beating at a club he gets himself a gun. During a normal film night, Leo pulls a gun on Lenny and Kitjo. Leo berates Lenny for his life style, and expresses his disdain for his own life, feeling trapped in a dead end. Later Leo, in despair, hits Louise, and is threatened by her brother, Louis. When it happens again, Louise loses the baby. Louis takes a gruesome revenge by injecting HIV infected blood into Leo's body. Leo retaliates in an equally gruesome manner, shooting Louis in the stomach, then shooting off his own hand and letting the blood drip into Louis' wound. Leo then commits suicide.

Kitjo brings Lenny to Leo's funeral but Lenny cannot bring himself to go. Life continues, and Lenny casually tells Kitjo that he has been offered a job in another store, but does not think he will accept as he has to change his routine. Lenny seeks up Lea again. They both seem shy towards each other, and have trouble communicating. Lenny asks Lea out a second time; the final image of the film shows them alone in the grill/bar where Lea works thus ending the film on a hopeful note.

Cast
Bleeder features a relatively small ensemble cast, where the most of the actors, except Corfixen and Andersson, previously starred in Refn's debut film Pusher. Jensen only had a small role in Pusher, his role in Bleeder is more developed.

 Kim Bodnia - Leo
 Mads Mikkelsen - Lenny
 Rikke Louise Andersson - Louise
 Levino Jensen - Louis
 Liv Corfixen - Lea
 Zlatko Burić - Kitjo
 Claus Flygare - Joe
 Marko Zecewic - Marko
 Gordana Radosavljevic - Mika
 Dusan Zecewic - Dusan 
 Ole Abildgaard - Video shop customer
 Karsten Schrøder - Røde
 Sven Erik Eskeland Larsen - Svend

Soundtrack

Music is used heavily throughout the entire film. The soundtrack features many Danish artists, including Peter Peter, Jesper Binzer, Lovebites and Düreforsög.

References

External links
 

1999 films
1999 crime drama films
Danish crime drama films
1990s Danish-language films
Films about domestic violence
Films directed by Nicolas Winding Refn
Films set in Copenhagen
Films shot in Denmark
Scanbox Entertainment films